Hawley "Huck" Welch (December 12, 1907 in Toronto, Ontario – May 15, 1979 in Ancaster, Ontario) was a star football player in  the Canadian Football League for eight seasons for the Hamilton Tigers and the Montreal AAA Winged Wheelers. He was inducted into the Canadian Football Hall of Fame in 1964 and into the Canada's Sports Hall of Fame in 1975.

References
 Canada's Sports Hall of Fame profile

External links

1907 births
1979 deaths
Canadian football people from Toronto
Players of Canadian football from Ontario
Hamilton Tigers football players
Canadian Football Hall of Fame inductees